Altdischingen Castle, also called the "Old Castle" is a former (Burgstall) hilltop castle around  above sea level in the Solitude state forest range of Weilimdorf, a district incorporated into Baden-Württemberg's capital Stuttgart in 1933.

No visible parts of the walls and buildings have been preserved above ground.

Notes

References
 ^ Bucher Gruppe (July 2010). Ehemalige Burganlage in Stuttgart: Burg Wirtemberg, Burgstall Weißenburg, Heidenburg, Ruine Engelburg, Burg Freienstein, Wasserburg Berg. General Books LLC. .
 Gerhard Wein: Die mittelalterlichen Burgen im Gebiet der Stadt Stuttgart, 2. Volume: Die Burgen in den Stadtteilen Solitude, Feuerbach, Cannstatt, Berg und Gaisburg. Stuttgart 1971.
  Hartwig Zürn: Die vor- und frühgeschichtlichen Geländedenkmale und die mittelalterlichen Burgstellen des Stadtkreises Stuttgart und der Kreise Böblingen, Esslingen und Nürtingen. Verlag Silberburg, Stuttgart 1956, P. 11.

Castles in Baden-Württemberg